A carbon–oxygen bond is a polar covalent bond between atoms of carbon and oxygen. Carbon–oxygen bonds are found in many inorganic compounds such as carbon oxides and oxohalides, carbonates and metal carbonyls, and in organic compounds such as alcohols, ethers, carbonyl compounds and oxalates. Oxygen has 6 valence electrons of its own and tends to fill its outer shell with 8 electrons by sharing electrons with other atoms to form covalent bonds, accepting electrons to form an anion, or a combination of the two. In neutral compounds, an oxygen atom can form up to two single bonds or one double bond with carbon, while a carbon atom can form up to four single bonds or two double bonds with oxygen.

Bonding motifs

Bonding at oxygen
In ethers, oxygen forms two covalent single bonds with two carbon atoms, C–O–C, whereas in alcohols oxygen forms one single bond with carbon and one with hydrogen, C–O–H. In carbonyl compounds, oxygen forms a covalent double bond with carbon, C=O, known as a carbonyl group. In ethers, alcohols and carbonyl compounds, the four nonbonding electrons in oxygen's outer shell form two lone pairs. In alkoxides, oxygen forms a single bond with carbon and accepts an electron from a metal to form an alkoxide anion, R–O−, with three lone pairs. In oxonium ions, one of oxygen's two lone pairs is used to form a third covalent bond which generates a cation, >O+– or =O+– or ≡O+, with one lone pair remaining.

Bonding at carbon
A carbon atom forms one single bond to oxygen in alcohols, ethers and peroxides, two in acetals, three in ortho esters, and four in orthocarbonates. Carbon forms a double bond to oxygen in aldehydes, ketones and acyl halides. In carboxylic acids, esters and anhydrides, each carbonyl carbon atom forms one double bond and one single bond to oxygen. In carbonate esters and carbonic acid, the carbonyl carbon forms one double bond and two single bonds to oxygen. In carbon dioxide, carbon forms two double bonds to oxygen.

Electronegativities and bond lengths
The C–O bond is strongly polarized towards oxygen (electronegativity of C vs O, 2.55 vs 3.44). Bond lengths for paraffinic C–O bonds are in the range of 143 pm – less than those of C–N or C–C bonds. Shortened single bonds are found with carboxylic acids (136 pm) due to partial double bond character and elongated bonds are found in epoxides (147 pm). The C–O bond strength is also larger than C–N or C–C. For example, bond strengths are /mol (at 298 K) in methanol, /mol in methylamine, and /mol in ethane.

Carbon and oxygen form terminal double bonds in functional groups collectively known as carbonyl compounds to which belong such compounds as ketones, esters, carboxylic acids and many more. Internal C=O bonds are found in positively charged oxonium ions.  In furans, the oxygen atom contributes to pi-electron delocalization via its filled p-orbital and hence furans are aromatic.  Bond lengths of C=O bonds are around 123 pm in carbonyl compounds. The C=O bond length in carbon dioxide is 116 pm. The C=O bonds in acyl halides have partial triple bond character and are consequently very short: 117 pm. Compounds with formal C≡O triple bonds do not exist except for carbon monoxide, which has a very short, strong bond (112.8 pm), and acylium ions, R–C≡O+ (typically 110-112 pm). Such triple bonds have a very high bond energy, even higher than N–N triple bonds. Oxygen can also be trivalent, for example in triethyloxonium tetrafluoroborate.

Chemistry
Carbon–oxygen bond forming reactions are the Williamson ether synthesis, nucleophilic acyl substitutions and electrophilic addition to alkenes. The Paternò–Büchi reaction involves carbonyl compounds.

Oxygen functional groups

Carbon–oxygen bonds are present in these functional groups:

See also
Carbon compounds#Carbon-oxygen compounds
Carbon–hydrogen bond
Carbon–carbon bond
Carbon–nitrogen bond
Carbon–fluorine bond
Silicon–oxygen bond

References

Oxygen compounds
Chemical bonding